Grassington & Threshfield railway station (or Threshfield station) was a railway station that served the villages of Grassington and Threshfield, in North Yorkshire, England.

History 
The Yorkshire Dales Railway constructed the line to Grassington & Threshfield, with services operated by the Midland Railway, to provide better links for local villages to the nearby town of Skipton. It diverged at Embsay Junction, and ran through the Dales, with a station at Rylstone, past the then 'Swinden Lime Works' (today known as Swinden Quarry), and a further  to Threshfield. Despite being the line's terminus, Grassington & Threshfield was built as a through station, because there were proposals to continue the line further north up the Dales to Kettlewell, and thence to Leyburn, to join the line to Hawes on the Wensleydale Railway. That was never done.

The station, which opened with the line in mid-1902, had two platforms, each with a run-round loop, and a goods shed and cattle dock with their own sidings. Another siding branched west towards Skirethorns Quarry, ending at the rear of a set of terraced houses known as Woodlands Terrace. Limestone was brought down from the quarry by a tramway to Woodlands Terrace, where it was transferred to trains.

On 22 September 1930, after only 28 years, the LMS withdrew regular passenger services due to poor patronage. However, excursion traffic continued for more than 30 years thereafter, as did general goods traffic and stone traffic from the nearby quarry. The end of quarrying in the early 1960s eventually led to the complete closure of the station, and the northern end of the branch, on 11 August 1969.

The Site Today

The track was lifted on the final section north of Swinden Quarry in 1971 and the old station buildings were demolished soon afterwards.  A housing estate now occupies the site.

Embsay Junction

Embsay Junction was laid at the opening of the line in 1902 to take trains from Skipton to Rylstone Station and Threshfield station. The branch was single throughout.

The other direction was the Skipton to Ilkley Line across the Dales, with stations at Embsay, Bolton Abbey, Addingham and finally ending up at Ilkley. The line was double-tracked, as it formed a useful relief route for the busy main line via Keighley.  The Ilkley line was closed in 1966, but the signal box at the junction remained in use until July 1969 (to give access for track-lifting trains and to the quarry siding at Embsay).  The remaining double track portion down to Skipton was singled at the same time.

References

External links 
Grassington & Threshfield information
 Grassington & Threshfield station on navigable 1948 O. S. map

Disused railway stations in North Yorkshire
Railway stations in Great Britain opened in 1902
Railway stations in Great Britain closed in 1969
Former Midland Railway stations
Grassington